The 56th Karlovy Vary International Film Festival took place from July 1 to 9, 2022, in Karlovy Vary, Czech Republic.

A total of 170 films were presented at the festival, including twenty-seven world premieres, three international and three European premieres. Canadian-Iranian co-produced film Summer with Hope won the Crystal Globe. The festival paid tributes to Czech actors Eva Zaoralová, Bolek Polívka and composer Zdeněk Liška.

Juries
The following were appointed as the juries at the 56th edition:

Crystal Globe Jury
Benjamin Domenech (Argentina)
Jan-Ole Gerster (Germany)
Roman Gutek (Poland)
Fiorella Moretti (Peru)
Molly Malene Stensgaard (Denmark)

Proxima Jury
Yrsa Roca Fannberg (Iceland)
Pavel Klusák (Czech Republic)
Michael Rosenberg (United States)
Myroslav Slaboshpytskyi (Ukraine)

The Ecumenical Jury
Annette Gjerde Hansen (Norway)
Veronika Lišková (Czech Republic)
Théo Péporté (Luxembourg)

Europa Cinemas Label Jury
Edit Csenki (Hungary)
Leena Närekangas (Finland)
Kis Rauff (Denmark)

FIPRESCI Jury
Nada Azhari Gillon (France)
Britt Sørensen (Norway)
Adam Kruk (Poland)
Gulnara Abikeyeva (Kazakhstan)
Rasha Hosny (Egypt)
Marek Čermák (Czech Republic)

Official selection

Crystal Globe

PROXIMA

Special Screenings

Horizons

Awards
The following awards were presented at the 56th edition:

Official selection awards
Grand Prix – Crystal Globe
Summer with Hope by Sadaf Foroughi

Special Jury Prize
You Have to Come and See It by Jonás Trueba

Best Director
Beata Parkanová for Word

Best Actress
Taki Mumladze for A Room of My Own
Mariam Khundadze for A Room of My Own

Best Actor
Martin Finger for Word

Other statutory awards
PROXIMA Grand Prix
Art Talent Show by Adéla Komrzý and Tomáš Bojar

PROXIMA Special Jury Prize
La Pietà by Eduardo Casanova

PROXIMA Special Jury Mention
The Uncle by David Kapac and Andrija Mardešić

Právo Audience Award
PSH Neverending Story by Štěpán Fok Vodrážka

Crystal Globe for Outstanding Artistic Contribution to World Cinema
Geoffrey Rush (Australia)

Festival President's Award for Contribution to Czech Cinematography
Bolek Polívka (Czech Republic)

Festival President's Award
Benicio del Toro (Puerto Rico)

Non-statutory awards
The Ecumenical Jury Award
A Provincial Hospital by Ilian Metev, Ivan Chertov and Zlatina Teneva

Europa Cinemas Label Award
Fucking Bornholm by Anna Kazejak-Dawid

FIPRESCI Award for Crystal Globe Competition
Borders of Love by Tomasz Wiński

FIPRESCI Award for PROXIMA Competition
Art Talent Show by Adéla Komrzý and Tomáš Bojar

References

External links

Karlovy Vary International Film Festival
Karlovy Vary International Film Festival
Karlovy Vary International Film Festival